The 2022 Lucas Oil 200 Driven by General Tire was the first stock car race of the 2022 ARCA Menards Series season and will be the 59th iteration of the event. The race was held on Saturday, February 19, 2022, in Daytona Beach, Florida at Daytona International Speedway, a 2.5 mile (4 km) permanent asphalt superspeedway. The race was run over 80 laps. Corey Heim of Venturini Motorsports would win the race after leading the most laps. This was Heim's eighth career ARCA Menards Series win, and his third superspeedway win.

Background 
Daytona International Speedway is one of three superspeedways to hold NASCAR races, the other two being Indianapolis Motor Speedway and Talladega Superspeedway. The standard track at Daytona International Speedway is a four-turn superspeedway that is 2.5 miles (4.0 km) long. The track's turns are banked at 31 degrees, while the front stretch, the location of the finish line, is banked at 18 degrees.

Entry list

Notes

Practice

First and final practice 

Qualifying 

Race results

Standings after the race 

Drivers' Championship standings

Note: Only the first 10 positions are included for the driver standings.

References 

2022 ARCA Menards Series
NASCAR races at Daytona International Speedway
Lucas Oil 200
Lucas Oil 200